Francis Donkin Bedford (1864–1954), also known as F. D. Bedford, was a British artist and illustrator. He was born in Notting Hill and lived in London. He painted genre scenes and exhibited at the Royal Academy from 1892.

Bedford's works include illustrations for A Book of Nursery Rhymes (1897), The Books of Shops (1899), Four and Twenty Toilers (1900), The Visit to London (1902), Forgotten Tales of Long Ago (1906), Runaways and Castaways (1908), Peter and Wendy (1911), The Magic Fishbone (1921), Under the Tree (1922),     A Christmas Carol (1923), and The Cricket on the Hearth (1927).

References

Notes

External links

 
 
 

1864 births
1954 deaths
British draughtsmen
British illustrators
19th-century illustrators of fairy tales
20th-century illustrators of fairy tales